Darren M. Howard (born November 19, 1976) is a former American football defensive end. He was drafted by the New Orleans Saints in the second round of the 2000 NFL Draft. He played college football at Kansas State.

Howard also played for the Philadelphia Eagles.

Early years
Howard attended Boca Ciega High School in Gulfport, Florida and was a letterman in football and basketball.  In football, he was an All-City, All-County, and an All-SunCoast selection.  In basketball, he helped lead his team to the 1994 Florida State Championship.

College career
Howard played college football at Kansas State.

Professional career

2000-2005: New Orleans Saints
Howard was drafted by the New Orleans Saints in the second round of the 2000 NFL Draft. From 2000-2005, he played defensive end for the Saints. In his rookie season he posted an impressive 11 sacks and an interception.

2006-2009: Philadelphia Eagles
On March 13, 2006, he joined the Philadelphia Eagles through free agency, by signing a six-year deal. In 2008, Howard led the Eagles in sacks (10.5), most of which came from the defensive tackle position in passing downs. He was released on March 18, 2010.

NFL statistics

References

1976 births
Living people
Players of American football from Florida
American football defensive ends
American football defensive tackles
Kansas State Wildcats football players
New Orleans Saints players
Philadelphia Eagles players
Ed Block Courage Award recipients